The Armed Forces General Staff, or EMGFA, is the supreme military body of Portugal. It is responsible for the planning, command and control of the Portuguese Armed Forces.

EMGFA is headed by the Chief of the General Staff of the Armed Forces or CEMGFA, the highest rank of general in the Portuguese Armed Forces.

History 
In 1950, as part of the Portuguese military reforms related with the lessons learned following World War II, the start of the Cold War and the foundation of NATO, the roles of minister of National Defence and of Chief of the Armed Forces General Staff (CEMGFA) were created. The creation of these roles was a major step in the planned integration of the several military service branches and so the establishment of the Armed Forces of Portugal as a single organization. The CEMGFA assumed most of the responsibilities until then assigned to the military heads of the Navy and of the Army, the then existing service branches, as the Air Force would only be created in 1952.

At the same time and as a forerunner of a future General Staff, the Secretariat-General of National Defence or SGDN was established. The SGDN was the central planning organization of the Defence, being headed by the CEMGFA.

In 1969, it was decreed that SGDN should be remodelled in order to be transformed into the Armed Forces General Staff (EMGFA), as the organization for the joint administration of the Armed Forces. However, transformation of the SGDN into the EMGFA occurred only in 1974.

Organization 
The Armed Forces General Staff is integrated into the Portuguese Ministry of National Defence and includes:
 The Chief of the General Staff of the Armed Forces (CEMGFA)
 The Joint Staff (EMC, Estado-Maior Conjunto)
 The Joint Operational Command (COC, Comando Operacional Conjunto)
 The operational commands of the Azores and Madeira
 The commanders-in-chief that can be created under the CEMGFA, in times of war
 The Military Security and Information Center (CISMIL, Centro de Informações e Segurança Militares)
 The general support organizations

Under the dependency of the CEMGFA are also:
 The Portuguese Joint Command and Staff College (IESM, Instituto de Estudos Superiores Militares)
 The Hospital of the Armed Forces (HFAR, Hospital das Forças Armadas)

The Chief of the General Staff 
The Chief of the General Staff of the Armed Forces is the operational commander of the Portuguese Armed Forces in times of peace. In times of war, he assumes the complete command of the Armed Forces. The CEMGFA is a general officer of one of the three branches of the Armed Forces (Army, Navy and Air Force), appointed by the President of Portugal, by proposal of the Government of Portugal.

List of chiefs of the General Staff

See also 
 Portuguese Army
 Portuguese Air Force
 Portuguese Navy
 National Republican Guard (Portugal)

Notes

References 
 RIBEIRO, António S., Organização Superior da Defesa Nacional, Prefácio, 2004

External links 
 Armed Forces General Staff – Official Site

Staff (military)
Portugal
1950 establishments in Portugal
Military of Portugal